This is a list of albums for the anime series School Rumble, based on the manga of the same name.  Singles have been released for the opening and ending theme songs for both seasons, in addition to two soundtracks.  There are also three vocal collections, three radio dramas, and eight character song albums.

Opening and ending themes

Scramble

 is the first opening theme song for School Rumble.  There are two versions, a Limited Edition (pictured) and a Regular Edition.  The Limited Edition version came with a DVD containing promotional videos.

Track listing

Scramble (スクランブル)
Go!Go!Golden Days
Scramble (off vocal) [スクランブル (off vocal version)]
Go!Go!Golden Days (off vocal)

Onna no ko Otoko no ko

 is the first ending theme song for School Rumble.  There are two versions, a Limited Edition (pictured) and a Regular Edition.  The Limited Edition version came with a DVD containing promotional videos.

Track listing

Onnanoko Otokonoko (オンナのコ オトコのコ)
恋の呪文はパパピプパ
Onnanoko Otokonoko [オンナのコ オトコのコ (off vocal)]
恋の呪文はパパピプパ (off vocal)

Sentimental Generation

 is the first opening theme song for School Rumble - Second Term, the second season of School Rumble.  The first ending theme for Second Term, is also on this single.  There are two versions, a Limited Edition, and a Regular Edition.  The Limited Edition version came with a DVD containing a music video for "Sentimental Generation".

Track listing

Sentimental Generation (せんちめんたる じぇねれ~しょん)
Kono Namida Ga Arukara Tsugi No Ippo To Naru (この涙があるから次の一歩となる)
Sentimental Generation (karaoke) [せんちめんたる じぇねれ~しょん(カラオケ)]
Kono Namida Ga Arukara Tsugi No Ippo To Naru (karaoke) [この涙があるから次の一歩となる (カラオケ)]

Futari wa Wasurechau 

 is the second ending theme song for School Rumble - Second Term, the second season of School Rumble, sung by the voice actors for Tenma Tsukamoto and Yakumo Tsukamoto, Ami Koshimizu and Mamiko Noto, respectively.

Track listings

Futari wa Wasurechau (二人は忘れちゃう)
大好きと 抱きしめて 飛ぶ ソング
Futari wa Wasurechau with Tenma version (二人は忘れちゃう with 天満 ver.)
Futari wa Wasurechau with Yakumo version (二人は忘れちゃう with 八雲 ver.)
Futari wa Wasurechau (original karaoke) [二人は忘れちゃう(オリジナルカラオケ)]
大好きと 抱きしめて 飛ぶ ソング with 天満 ver.
大好きと 抱きしめて 飛ぶ ソング with 八雲 ver.
大好きと 抱きしめて 飛ぶ ソング(オリジナルカラオケ)

Soundtracks

School Rumble - Sound School

 is the first anime soundtrack for the TV series School Rumble, featuring compositions by Toshiyuki Omori.  The first pressings of Sound School included a bonus CD-ROM that contained illustrations by School Rumble creator Jin Kobayashi.

Track listing

School Rumble Nigakki Original Soundtrack - Yagami Ongakusai

 is the anime soundtrack for School Rumble - Second Term, the second season of School Rumble.  It also features compositions by Toshiyuki Omori.

Track listing

Vocal CDs

School Rumble Super Twin Album ~School Tea Cha!~

 is a two disc drama CD and soundtrack album.

Track listing

Disc 1
スクランブル (Tvサイズ) 
ドラマ第1話『茶道部で合宿! 2』 
ドラマ第2話『茶道部で懺悔!』 
銀河沿線 '05 
ドラマ第3話『ヒルズでムカッ! 懺悔室で、もっとムカッ!』 
ドラマ第4話『茶道部でバンジー』 
オンナのコ♡オトコのコ (Tvサイズ)

Disc 2
～第一幕～ イントロダクション 
～第一幕～ 俺様の名は播磨拳児 
～第一幕～ 芝居1 
～第一幕～ 芝居2 
～第一幕～ 深呼吸して 
～第一幕～ アイ・ロベ・ヨウ 
～第一幕～ 芝居3 
～第一幕～ 芝居4 
～第一幕～ フレンチポップス 
～第一幕～ 芝居5 
～第一幕～ 普通ブギ 
～第一幕～ 芝居6 
～第一幕～ 何より悔しいコト 
～第一幕～ 芝居7 
～第一幕～ ボスフォラス 
～第二幕～ 芝居8 
～第二幕～ スポ根?ミスコン? 
～第二幕～ 芝居9 
～第二幕～ 芝居10 
～第二幕～ He Is Not A Boy 
～第二幕～ 芝居11 
～第二幕～ マスク 
～第二幕～ 芝居12 
～第二幕～ 肉じゃがパパ 
～第二幕～ 芝居13 
～第二幕～ 芝居14 
～第二幕～ 今鳥恭介の本音と建前ソング 
～第二幕～ 花井春樹の本音と建前ソング 
～第二幕～ 芝居15 
～第二幕～ 大好きな人 
～第二幕～ No More Feel 
～第二幕～ 芝居16 
～第二幕～ す、す、すきです 
～第二幕～ 芝居17 
～第二幕～ No More Feel 
～第二幕～ す、す、すきです (スタジオレコーディング Ver.)

School Rumble Super Twin Album ~School After~

 is a two disc drama CD and soundtrack album, and a follow up to School Rumble Super Twin Album ~School Tea Cha！~.

Track listing
Disc 1
ドラマ第5話 「懺悔室でお茶会!海原で遭難!」 
ドラマ第6話 「キストークでドキドキ!」 
ドラマ第7話 「いよいよ地上戦!」 
ドラマ第8話 「とうとう海で大決戦!」

Disc 2
ステキな予感 - 塚本天満 (小清水亜美) 
夕顔 - 塚本八雲 (能登麻美子) 
The super girl has the super heart - 周防美琴 (生天目仁美) 
Feel my feeling - 沢近愛理 (堀江由衣) 
Boy - 高野晶 (清水香里) 
毎日がRendez-vous - 一条かれん (南里侑香) 
Best Friend - サラ・アディエマス (福井裕佳梨) 
君へ～風にのせて～ - 播磨拳児 (高橋広樹) 
Closer - unicorn table 
17's Heart - 佐伯美愛 
He stands the rain - 塚本天満 (小清水亜美) 
Lovin you - 周防美琴 (生天目仁美) 
破天荒ロボ ドジビロンのテーマ - 浪花十三 
海の男はよ - 鬼哭丸少年合唱団 
School Rumble 4 Ever - 塚本天満・周防美琴・沢近愛理・高野晶

School Rumble Nigakki: Vocal Best

 is a two disc vocal album featuring the voice actors for several of the characters.  The second disc features karaoke versions of the songs in the first disc.

Voice actors
Ami Koshimizu (Tenma Tsukamoto)
Hiroki Takahashi (Kenji Harima)
Mamiko Noto (Yakumo Tsukamoto)
Yui Horie (Eri Sawachika)
Hitomi Nabatame (Mikoto Suō)
Kaori Shimizu (Akira Takano)    
Yuuka Nanri (Karen Ichijou)
Yukari Fukui (Sarah Adiemus)

Track listing

Disc 1

せんちめんたる じぇねれ～しょん
GIRLS CAN ROCK
Feel like a girl 
チャンス☆だぜ！ 
DEPENDENCE 
Love ∞  
Poka Poka
大好きと 抱きしめて 飛ぶ ソング) 
Love & Peace  
こころの道 
ルチャドール  
NEVER ALONE  
スクールHEAVEN  
この涙かあるから次の一歩となる  
二人は忘れちゃう

Disc 2
せんちめんたる じぇねれ～しょん (カラオケ)
GIRLS CAN ROCK (カラオケ)
Feel like a girl (カラオケ)
チャンス☆だぜ！(カラオケ)
DEPENDENCE (カラオケ)
Love ∞ (カラオケ)
Poka Poka
大好きと 抱きしめて 飛ぶ ソング) (カラオケ)
Love & Peace  (カラオケ)
こころの道 (カラオケ)
ルチャドール (カラオケ)
NEVER ALONE (カラオケ)
スクールHEAVEN(カラオケ)  
この涙かあるから次の一歩となる (カラオケ)
二人は忘れちゃう(カラオケ)

Radio dramas

Ura School Rumble Nigakki Die Another D!

 is the first radio drama for School Rumble - Second Term, featuring the voice actors Ami Koshimizu, Mamiko Noto, Yui Horie, Hitomi Nabatame, Kaori Shimizu, and Yukari Fukui.

Track listing

打ち合わせ  
OPENING  
M1「Poka Poka」／サラ・アディエマス(CV. 福井裕佳梨)  
前提供クレジット  
SPECIAL TALK1「スクランに学ぶ人生、略して、スクラン学！」  
M2「NEVER ALONE」／塚本八雲(CV. 能登麻美子)  
CM中OFF TALK1  
RADIO DRAMA1「天満と愛理のお料理教室」  
M3「スクールHEAVEN」／塚本天満(CV. 小清水亜美)  
CM中OFF TALK2  
SPECIAL TALK2「生天目仁美に10の質問!!」  
ENDING・後提供クレジット  
RADIO DRAMA2「美琴の人生相談1／相談者：西本願司」  
番組終了後

Ura School Rumble Nigakki Hime no Kikan!

 is the second radio drama for School Rumble - Second Term, featuring the voice actors Mamiko Noto, Hitomi Nabatame, and Kaori Shimizu.

Track listing

打ち合わせ  
OPENING・前提供クレジット  
SPECIAL TALK1「スクランに学ぶ人生、略して、スクラン学!」  
Love∞  
曲送り・CM中OFF TALK1  
RADIO DRAMA1「天満のアルバイト編」  
ルチャドール  
曲送り・CM中OFF TALK2  
SPECIAL TALK2「能登麻美子に10の質問!!」  
こころの道  
ENDING・後提供クレジット  
番組終了後

Ura School Rumble Nigakki Megane no Seisen!

 is the third radio drama for School Rumble - Second Term, featuring the voice actors Mamiko Noto, Hitomi Nabatame, and Kaori Shimizu, Yui Horie.  Shinji Kawada, the voice actor for Haruki Hanai, also appears on this CD.  He is not on the other radio dramas for Second Term, and is the only male voice actor to make a vocal appearance in any of the three.

Track listing

打ち合わせ  
OPENING・前提供クレジット  
SPECIAL TALK1「スクランに学ぶ人生、略して、スクラン学!」  
DEPENDENCE  
曲送り・CM中OFF TALK1  
RADIO DRAMA1「晶の野球実況」  
チャンス☆だぜ!  
曲送り・CM中OFF TALK2  
SPECIAL TALK2「川田紳司、改・清水香里に10の質問!!」  
Love&Peace  
ENDING・後提供クレジット  
RADIO DRAMA2「美琴の人生相談2/相談者:吉田山次郎」  
番組終了後

Character image albums

There are eight character image albums.  Each has songs sung by the voice actors for the respective character and drama tracks including other characters' voice actors.  Seven of the albums are for female characters: the female protagonist Tenma Tsukamoto, the supporting characters Yakumo Tsukamoto, Mikoto Suo, Eri Sawachika, and Akira Takano, and two minor characters, Karen Ichijou and Sarah Adiemus. The male protagonist of the series, Kenji Harima, is the only male character to have an image album.

Notes

References

 

 

School Rumble
Albums
Film and television discographies
Discographies of Japanese artists